Obi Ikechukwu Charles (born 6 April 1985) is a Nigerian professional football player, a striker. He currently plays for Sime Darby F.C.

References

External links 
 FCSuduroy.com
 FaroeSoccer.com, Obi Charles.
 YouTube.com, Charles Obi Ikechukwu.

1984 births
Living people
Nigerian footballers
Cypriot First Division players
FC Suðuroy players
Boavista F.C. players
Doxa Katokopias FC players
Flamurtari Vlorë players
Nigerian expatriate footballers
Expatriate footballers in Malaysia
Expatriate footballers in Cyprus
Expatriate footballers in Finland
Expatriate footballers in Albania
Expatriate footballers in the Faroe Islands
Association football forwards
Expatriate footballers in Myanmar
UiTM FC players
Sime Darby F.C. players